Marcel-André Baschet (5 August 1862 – 28 December 1941) was a French portrait painter, notable for his numerous portraits of the Presidents of the French Third Republic.

Biography 

He was born in Gagny (Seine-et-Oise), the second son of the art editor , editor of Panorama and the Revue illustrée. His brother René was the art critic for Salonsavant, and was editor of the magazine L'Illustration from 1904 to the first half of the 20th century. At 17, Marcel entered the Académie Julian in the studio of Jules Lefebvre. A student at the École des beaux-arts de Paris in the studio of Gustave Boulanger, in 1883 he won the Grand Prix de Rome for painting for Oedipus curses his son Polynices, and became a pensionist at the Villa Médicis in Rome from 1883 to 1887.

On 3 January 1888, he married Jeanne Guillemeteau, and they had two children, one son and one daughter. He became a teacher at the Académie Julian in 1889. From 1900, he spent a number of years as a teacher to Princess Mathilde. From 1907 to 1941, he had a shop at 21 Quai Voltaire in Paris, where a commemorative plaque was placed after his death. He won the médaille d'honneur in 1908 for his portrait of Henri Rochefort, and his portrait of Claude Debussy was exhibited around the world. He was awarded the Knight of the Légion d'honneur in 1898, and then in 1913, he was elected a member of the Académie des beaux-arts.

His works are held in a number of private collections and museums, including the Musée d'Orsay and Château de Versailles. His younger brother Jacques (1872–1952) was a historian, art critic, artistic director, and editor of the magazine L'Illustration, and director of a national company.

Works 
(incomplete list)

Paintings

 Claude Debussy, 1884, oil on panel, 24.5 x 21.5 cm, Musée d'Orsay
 M. Vendryès, 1892
 Ambroise Thomas, portrait presented at the exhibition of the Salon des artistes français in 1895, published in L'Artiste, November 1896
 Henri Brisson, 1896
 Mrs Gabriel Pierné, wife of the composer, 1897, presented in competition at the Salon des artistes français in 1898
 Charles Pardinel, 1898
 Portrait of family, 1899, oil on canvas, presented in competition at the Salon des artistes français
 Comtesse de Bourbon-Ligniéres, 1900
 Mrs Delacroix, 1900
 René Baschet, 1901
 Armande Fajard, 1901
 Pierre Baschet, 1901
 Jérôme Doucet
 Mrs René Baschet, 1905
 Jules Lefebvre, 1905
 Roger Baschet, 1907
 Ludovic Baschet, 1907
 Henri Lavedan, 1907
 Mrs Georges Leygues, 1907
 Henri Rochefort, 1908
 Louise Weiss, 1909
 Jean Richepin, 1910
 Count of Gramont, 1910
 Countess Pillet-Will, 1910
 Count of Bourbon-Lignières, 1910
 Miss Cocteau, 1910
 Seydoux boys, 1910
 Marquis de Dion, 1911
 Raymond Poincaré, 1913
 Suzanne Fajard, 1915
 Mrs Lyautey, 1915
 Aristide Briand, 1917
 Général Gouraud, 1919
 Maréchal Foch, 1919, pastel on paper, 57 x 42 cm, Musée de l'Armée
 Duke of Mortemart, 1919
 Miss Michelin, 1920
 Alexandre Millerand, 1922
 Gaston Doumergue, 1926, oil on canvas, 122 x 95 cm, Musée du Château de Versailles
 Philippe Pétain, 1926
 The Maharajah of Kapurthala, 1927
 Maréchal Fayolle, 1927
 Duchess of Brissac, 1927
 Mr and Mrs Schlumberger, 1928
 Marquis of Juigné, 1929
 Marquis of Vogüé, 1929
 Baron von Zuylen, 1929
 Duke of Broglie, 1930
 Général Weygand, 1930
 Maurice de Broglie, 1932
 Paul Doumer, 1932, oil on canvas, 137 x 101 cm, Musée du Château de Versailles
 Albert Lebrun, 1934, oil on canvas, 129 x 104 cm, Musée du Château de Versailles
 Fadri Aga Khan, 1934
 Mrs Roger Couvelaire, 1930
 Baron of Turckeim, 1938
 Édouard Branly, 1939

Engravings, lithographs
 Le Salon de Peinture, portrait of Melle Louise Lyman

Illustrations
 Drogues et Peinture 24 illustrations by the artist, édition Laboratoire pharmaceutique Chantereau à Paris, Album d'Art Contemporain, n° 54, s. d., v. 1937

Exhibitions
 1908  - Salon des Artistes Français : Médaille d'Honneur

Prizes, awards 
 1883 - First Grand Prix de Rome for painting
 1908 - Médaille d'Honneur of the Salon des Artistes Français
 1913 - Member of the Académie des beaux-arts
 Society of Artistes français

Museums, monuments 
 Musée de l'Armée
 Musée du Château de Versailles
 Musée d'Orsay

Students
(incomplete list)

 John William Ashton (1881–1963)
 Pierre Gourdault (1880-1915)
 Léonie Humbert-Vignot (1878-1960) at the Académie Julian
 Marthe Orant (1874-1951)
 Charles Picart le Doux (1881-1959)
 André Prévot-Valéri (1890-1956)
 Paulo do Valle Júnior (1886-1958)
 Thérèse Geraldy (1884-1965)

Bibliography
 François Antoine Vizzavona, Portrait de l'Artiste en Académicien
 Jacques Baschet, Marcel Baschet, sa vie, son œuvre, Imp Sadag, L'Illustration, 1942
 Société des Artistes Français. Salon de 1928: Exposition Annuelle des Beaux-Arts, 1928.
 Joseph Uzanne, Figures contemporaines tirées de l'album Mariani, Librairie Henri Floury Paris, vol. VI, 1901

Notes and references

External links 

 Photographic archives of the Ministry of Culture. Bases Archim et ARCADE

19th-century French painters
French male painters
20th-century French painters
20th-century French male artists
19th-century French male artists
French portrait painters
Members of the Académie des beaux-arts
Prix de Rome for painting
Commandeurs of the Légion d'honneur
Académie Julian alumni
Academic staff of the Académie Julian
École des Beaux-Arts alumni
People from Gagny
1862 births
1941 deaths